Campylorhaphion is a genus of sea snails, marine gastropod mollusks in the family Eulimidae.

Species
There are only two known species within this genus, these include the following:
 Campylorhaphion famelicum (Watson, 1883)
 Campylorhaphion flexum (A. Adams, 1861)
 Campylorhaphion machaeropse (Dautzenberg & Fischer H., 1896)

References

External links
 To World Register of Marine Species

Eulimidae